Bryce Treggs (born April 30, 1994) is a former American football wide receiver. He played college football at California, and was signed by the San Francisco 49ers as an undrafted free agent after the 2016 NFL Draft.

Professional career

San Francisco 49ers
Treggs signed with the San Francisco 49ers as an undrafted free agent on May 6, 2016. He was waived on September 3, 2016.

Philadelphia Eagles
Treggs was claimed off waivers by the Philadelphia Eagles on September 4, 2016.

On September 2, 2017, Treggs was waived by the Eagles and was signed to the practice squad the next day.

Cleveland Browns
On October 4, 2017, Treggs was signed by the Cleveland Browns off the Eagles' practice squad. He was waived on December 13, 2017.

Philadelphia Eagles (second stint)
On December 14, 2017, Treggs was signed to the Eagles' practice squad. While Treggs was on their practice squad, the Eagles defeated the New England Patriots in Super Bowl LII. He signed a reserve/future contract with the Eagles on February 7, 2018.

On September 1, 2018, Treggs was waived by the Eagles.

Personal life
His father, Brian Treggs, also played college football at Cal and in the NFL.

References

External links
California Golden Bears bio
Philadelphia Eagles bio

1994 births
Living people
American football wide receivers
California Golden Bears football players
Cleveland Browns players
People from Bellflower, California
Philadelphia Eagles players
Players of American football from California
San Francisco 49ers players
Sportspeople from Los Angeles County, California